Secret of St. Job Forest is a 1917 Hungarian film directed by Michael Curtiz.

Cast
 Imre Pethes
 Jenő Törzs

External links

1917 films
Films directed by Michael Curtiz
Hungarian silent films
Hungarian black-and-white films
Austro-Hungarian films